Cope's climbing salamander (Bolitoglossa morio) is a species of salamander in the family Plethodontidae.
It is endemic to Guatemala.
Its natural habitats are subtropical or tropical moist montane forests and heavily degraded former forest.
It is threatened by habitat loss.

References

Bolitoglossa
Endemic fauna of Guatemala
Amphibians of Guatemala
Amphibians described in 1869
Taxonomy articles created by Polbot